The Palace of Angels is a 1970 Brazilian-French drama film directed by Walter Hugo Khouri. It was selected to compete for the Palme d'Or at the 1970 Cannes Film Festival.

Plot 
Bárbara is a French woman who lives in São Paulo and, with two other friends, decides to transform her apartment into a luxurious brothel (title of the film), with which she obtains money and prestige, but also finds many emotional problems.

Cast
 Geneviève Grad as Bárbara
 Adriana Prieto as Ana Lúcia
 Rossana Ghessa as Mariazinha
 Luc Merenda as Ricardo
 Norma Bengell as Dorothy
 Joana Fomm as Rose
 John Herbert as Carlos Eduardo
 Alberto Ruschel as José Roberto
 Sérgio Hingst as Mr. Strauss
 Pedro Paulo Hatheyer as Dr. Luiz
 Zózimo Bulbul as Senegal's ambassador

References

External links

1970 films
1970 drama films
Brazilian drama films
1970s Portuguese-language films
Films directed by Walter Hugo Khouri
Films shot in Brazil